Subnitrides are a class of nitrides wherein the electropositive element is in excess relative to the “normal” nitrides.

Examples of subnitrides include

 Dicyanoacetylene
 Na16Ba6N features a nitride-centered octahedral cluster of six barium atoms embedded in a matrix of sodium.
 Boron subnitrides (B13N2, B50N2, B6N)

References

Nitrides